The Grossmann Fantastic Film and Wine Festival is a Slovenian film festival specialized in genre movies, with emphasis on horror and fantasy. The festival takes place every year in mid-July in the town of Ljutomer, in the winegrowing Prlekija region.

History
The first edition took place in 2005 on the 100th anniversary of Slovenian cinema in Ljutomer, where the first Slovenian motion pictures were made by Dr. Karol Grossmann. It was initiated by Film Practice Plan 9 and Development Agency of Prlekija with help from the European Structural Fund. It featured a selection of independent movies and brought to Ljutomer most of their authors, which was not common in Slovenia. Since 2006, the festival features a wine program. The accompanying program features live concerts, exhibitions, book presentations, and Zombie Walk.  Since 2020, the festival takes place in Ljutomer and Ormož.

Since 2010, Grossmann Fantastic Film and Wine Festival is an adherent member of the Méliès International Festivals Federation (MIFF).

Awards
Each year, Grossmann Fantastic Film and Wine Festival presents the following awards:

Vicious Cat - Best Feature Film Award
Slak's Vicious Cat - Best Short Film Award
Melies d'Argent - nomination for Melies d'Or, the Best European Fantastic Short Film Award given by the European Fantastic Film Festivals Federation
Noisy Cat - Best Music Documentary Award
Vicious Cat Wine Champion - Best Wine Award
Honorary Vicious Cat - Lifetime Achievement Award

Award winners are selected by international juries. The Festival also features a competitive film workshop (since 2008, it is the Roger Corman-inspired The Little Workshop of Horrors, where guerrilla movie crews have to shoot their films in two days and a night).

Winners

See also

Other Genre Film Festivals
 Fantafestival

References

External links 
Grossmann Fantastic Film and Wine Festival official website in English
European Fantastic Film Festivals Federation official website

Film festivals in Slovenia
Fantasy and horror film festivals
Film festivals established in 2005
Summer events in Slovenia
2005 establishments in Slovenia